Jacky Durand (born 10 February 1967 in Laval, Mayenne) is a French former professional road bicycle racer. Durand had an attacking style, winning the Tour of Flanders in 1992 after a  breakaway, and three stages in the Tour de France.

Durand turned professional in 1990. He was national road champion in 1993 and 1994 and won Paris–Tours in 1998, the first French winner in 42 years. Durand rode seven Tours de France, finishing last in the 1999 race. In 1995 he was the surprise winner of the prologue, starting before it began raining. He wore the yellow jersey for two days. Durand won the combativity award in the 1998 and 1999 Tour de France; the latter year he also took the Lanterne Rouge. He retired at the end of 2004. He has since worked for Eurosport as a commentator.

Amateur career
Durand was born to a poor farming family in the Mayenne region of northern France. He started racing in the minime class, the very youngest, but never won a race there or in the older cadet category. "It's difficult to win as a kid when you're neither a climber nor a sprinter", he said. "For me, the most beautiful jersey in the world is the French champion's. Yes, when they play the Marseillaise for you after a championship and then you go and show it off for three weeks in the Tour de France, the national flag on your shoulders, it's emotion and pleasure every day." As a senior, however, he won the national amateur team time-trial championship in 1988 with Laurent Bezault, Pascal Lino and Thierry Laurent. He turned professional in 1991.

Lone breaks
Durand became celebrated for long, lone attacks which sometimes succeeded but usually didn't. The French magazine, Vélo, printed a monthly Jackymètre to log the kilometres ridden at the head of races during the course of the season. Durand said: "Fortunately, in cycling, it's not always the best who wins, otherwise we wouldn't win so often."

His riding style was encouraged by his first directeur sportif, Cyrille Guimard. It brought him a seemingly suicidal win in the Tour of Flanders (see below). Guimard told him to attack early in the national championship at Châtellerault in 1993, to try his chance and to spoil those of Laurent Brochard and Luc Leblanc. The writer, Jean-François Quénet, said Guimard told Durand to attack far from the finish "because he didn't want to see Laurent Brochard in blue, white and red and even less did he want a second consecutive title for Luc Leblanc, who was in disgrace in the Castorama team.".

Of the way he rode, Durand said:

I'm not a revolutionary of any sort, but on the bike, I've always refused to come out of a mould. It astonishes me that most riders are followers, even sheep. A lot of them, the only people who know they're in the Tour are their directeurs sportifs. I couldn't do the job like that. They finish the Tour without having attacked once, maybe the whole of the season, even the whole of their career. I'd rather finish shattered and last having attacked a hundred times than finish 25th without having tried. Yes, I get ragged about it, but it's always in a friendly way. In the bunch, the guys know that Dudu is as likely to finish a long way behind them as first.

Tour of Flanders
Durand won the Ronde van Vlaanderen, or Tour of Flanders, in 1992, 36 years after the last French winner, Jean Forestier, in 1956. He broke away from the field with Thomas Wegmüller after a quarter of the race, with 217 km still to ride. His success as an outsider, and after such a long lone ride, stayed in the memory of Belgian fans. Years later, Durand was stopped for speeding. The Belgian policeman who came to his car said, "Vous avez gagné le Tour des Flandres en nonante-deux" ("You won the Tour of Flanders in '92") – and let him drive on.

Durand finished his career with Belgian teams. "Winning the Ronde made me a bit of a naturalised Belgian", he said.

Doping and disqualification
Durand took drugs during the Tour de la Côte Picarde in 1996 and was given a one-month probationary suspension. He was disqualified during the Tour de France in 2002 for holding on to a car during the mountainous stage to the Plateau de Beille in the Pyrenees. There had been complaints from riders, including the Czech, Ján Svorada, that he had done the same the previous year.

His name was on the list of doping tests published by the French Senate on 24 July 2013 that were collected during the 1998 Tour de France and found positive for EPO when retested in 2004.

Retirement
Durand retired from racing in 2005 after receiving no team offers. He followed that year's Tour de France as representative of the supermarket chain, Champion. He is now a television commentator for Eurosport.

Private life
Durand stayed loyal to his first club, CC Renzé, throughout his career. He lives in Mauritius.

On 25 November 2017, Durand's 80-year-old father, Henri Durand, was reported missing by his wife, Colette, after he went out for his usual bicycle ride and never returned. His body was found in a lake on 2 January 2018, in between Ballots and Saint-Michel-de-la-Roë. An autopsy confirmed he had died from drowning.

Major results

1988
 1st Stage 4a (ITT) Circuit Franco-Belge
1990
 4th Chrono des Herbiers
1991
 1st Grand Prix d'Isbergues
1992
 1st Tour of Flanders
1993
 1st  Road race, National Road Championships
 1st  Points classification Critérium du Dauphiné Libéré
1994
 1st  Road race, National Road Championships
 1st Stage 10 Tour de France
 Tour du Limousin
1st Stages 2 & 4 
 3rd Polynormande
 7th Overall Tour de l'Oise
1995
 Tour de France
1st Prologue 
Held  after Prologue & Stage 1 
Held  after Prologue 
 1st Stage 4 Grand Prix du Midi Libre
 3rd Overall Tour de l'Oise
 8th Cholet-Pays de Loire
1996
 2nd Overall Tour du Poitou Charentes
 2nd Overall Tour de Normandie
 2nd GP de la Ville de Rennes
 3rd Tour de Vendée
 9th Overall Route du Sud
1997
 2nd A Travers le Morbihan
 5th Paris–Bourges
 5th Chrono des Herbiers
1998
 1st Paris–Tours
 Tour de France
1st Stage 8
 Combativity award
 1st Stage 2 Tour de Luxembourg
 2nd Overall Tour de Pologne
1st Stage 7
 2nd Châteauroux Classic
 3rd Overall Tour du Limousin
 4th Chrono des Herbiers
 4th Grand Prix des Nations
 7th Grand Prix Eddy Merckx (with Marc Streel)
1999
 1st Stage 5 Paris–Nice
 3rd Châteauroux Classic
 Vuelta a España
Held  after Stages 1–2
 Tour de France
 Combativity award
2000
 National Road Championships
2nd Road race
7th Time trial
 5th Overall Bayern Rundfahrt
2001
 1st Tro-Bro Léon
 2nd Overall Circuit Franco-Belge
 7th GP de Fourmies
 10th Chrono des Herbiers
 10th Grand Prix Eddy Merckx (with Bradley McGee)
2002
 1st Stage 1 Critérium du Dauphiné Libéré
 2nd Overall Tour de Picardie
 2nd Paris–Tours
 5th Tartu Tänavasóit
 5th GP Rudy Dhaenens
 7th E.O.S. Tallinn GP
2003
 3rd Châteauroux Classic
 8th Tartu Tänavasóit
 8th E.O.S. Tallinn GP

References

External links 
Jacky Durand fan web site

Official Tour de France results for Jacky Durand

French male cyclists
French Tour de France stage winners
Doping cases in cycling
French sportspeople in doping cases
Tour de France prologue winners
1967 births
Living people
Cycling announcers
People from Laval, Mayenne
Sportspeople from Mayenne
Cyclists from Pays de la Loire